Adam Fairclough (born 1952) is a British (English) historian of the United States. He is the Raymond and Beverly Sackler Professor of American History at the University of Leiden in the Netherlands. Between 2008 and 2014, he served as the chair of the Netherlands American Studies Association. He has written on a number of subjects, and specializes in the Civil Rights Movement and the period of Reconstruction. His best known work is To Redeem the Soul of America: The Southern Christian Leadership Conference and Martin Luther King, Jr. Fairclough is a qualified expert in the field of American History, but specializes in the Civil Rights Movement.

Partial bibliography
To Redeem the Soul of America: The Southern Christian Leadership Conference and Martin Luther King, Jr. (1987)
Race & Democracy: The Civil Rights Struggle in Louisiana, 1915-1972, University of Georgia Press (Lillian Smith Book Award winner, 1995)
Better Day Coming: Blacks and Equality, 1890-2000, Viking Press (2001)
A Class of Their Own: Black Teachers in the Segregated South (2006)

References 

1952 births
Historians of the United States
Living people
Historians of the civil rights movement